The 1999 Junior League World Series took place from August 16–21 in Taylor, Michigan, United States. Arroyo, Puerto Rico defeated Hermosillo, Mexico in the championship game. 

This year featured the debut of the Far East region.

Teams

Results

Winner's Bracket

Loser's Bracket

Elimination Round

References

Junior League World Series
Junior League World Series